The 2001 Brownlow Medal was the 74th year the award was presented to the player adjudged the fairest and best player during the Australian Football League (AFL) home-and-away season. Jason Akermanis of the Brisbane Lions won the medal by polling twenty-three votes during the 2001 AFL season.

Leading votegetters 

* The player was ineligible to win the medal due to suspension by the AFL Tribunal during the year.

References 

Brownlow Medal
2001
Brownlow Medal